The Ghost Squad is a British crime drama series produced by Company Pictures, for Channel 4, broadcast from 15 November to 27 December 2005. Created by Tom Grieves, the series was inspired by the real life "Ghost Squad" that existed between 1994 and 1998, secretly investigating police corruption. Elaine Cassidy, Emma Fielding and Jonas Armstrong star as protagonists Amy Harris, Carole McKay and Pete Maitland.

A single series of eight episodes (including a double-length finale) was broadcast before the series was axed, citing poor viewing figures, despite critical acclaim from critics and viewers alike. The series has since been released on DVD in France and Australia only; a release in its native United Kingdom was pulled as a result of poor projected sales.

Plot
The premise of The Ghost Squad revolves around Detective Constable Amy Harris (Elaine Cassidy), who is recruited into the squad after investigating her own colleagues for corruption following a death in custody. Based upon the real-life "Ghost Squad", writer and creator Tom Grieves explains that the real-life closure of the squad meant that he had to write the story as if the squad continued to operate in secret after officially being shut down.

A total of eight episodes were broadcast, including a double-length finale that was split into two-halves for international broadcast. All eight episodes have since been uploaded for streaming on YouTube by the series' production company. Charles Pattinson and George Faber served as executive producers.

Cast
 Elaine Cassidy as P.C./D.C. Amy Harris
 Emma Fielding as D.S.I. Carole McKay
 Jonas Armstrong as D.S. Pete Maitland
 James Weber-Brown as D.A.C. Robert Townsend

Guest cast
 Lloyd Owen as D.I. Bryce (Episode 1)
 Sam Spruell as P.C. Will Surridge (Episode 1)
 Christine Tremarco as D.S. Jo Miller (Episode 1)
 Johnny Harris as D.S. Charlie Fletcher (Episode 1)
 Alastair Galbraith as D.I. Brooke, IPCC (Episode 1)
 Brendan Coyle as P.S. Ralph Allen (Episode 3)
 Jason Flemyng as D.S. Jimmy Franks (Episode 5)
 Chloe Howman as D.S. Kay Maudsley (Episode 5)
 Neve McIntosh as W.P.C. Sarah Houghton (Episode 6)
 Adrian Lester as D.I. Gus Phillips (Episodes 7—8)

Episode list

References

External links

The Ghost Squad at Channel 4

2005 British television series debuts
2005 British television series endings
2000s British crime drama television series
2000s British television miniseries
Television series by All3Media
English-language television shows
Channel 4 television dramas